Mahendra Singh Kalukheda was an Indian National Congress politician and former minister. He died in September 2017 after a prolonged illness.

Mahendra Singh Kalukheda was Born in A Maratha Royal  in Malwa Region of Kalukheda

Political career
Kalukheda had begun his political career from student politics. He became MLA in 1972 for the first time from legislative assembly. In 2013, he had become an MLA for the sixth time. He was the chairman of the public account committee of the state assembly. He was also an MP in 1984.

See also
Madhya Pradesh Legislative Assembly
2013 Madhya Pradesh Legislative Assembly election

References

External links

Indian former leader

Indian National Congress politicians from Madhya Pradesh
2017 deaths